Erckartswiller is a commune, in the Bas-Rhin department in Grand Est in north-eastern France. It is part of the arrondissement of Saverne and the canton of Ingwiller.

History

In 1176, the Holy Roman Emperor donated the Ekengeriswilre monastic grange to Neubourg Abbey in nearby Dauendorf. The fiefdom of Erkartswyler was sold by the Burn family to the lord of Lichtenberg in 1345. Following the end of the lordship of Lichtenberg, the town was transferred to the lord of Oberbronn in 1480 and to the count of Linange (fr) in 1541. Like several cities in the vicinity, many of the inhabitants left during the Thirty Years War and the town was uninhabited from 1649–1651. During the Franco-Prussian War, a brigade of the retreating French army passed through the town on 7 August 1870, during which they quickly mobilized to fight what turned out to be a false alert before slowly advancing to La Petite-Pierre.

Since Erckartswiller lacks significant arable land, the inhabitants have historically lived off of the surrounding forests, with a sizeable number of cobblers. The town also has a windmill, located along the Mittelbach River, which was built before 1630 and continued to function until the early 20th century.

Religion
Saint Apollonia Chapel (French: Chapelle Sainte-Apollonie), dedicated to Saint Apollonia, is the town's Protestant church. The church's bell tower dates to the 14th century and the church is mentioned for the first time in 1371. Alterations and expansions were made in 1613, 1669, and 1739 and the church was restored in 1994.

The sisters of Neuenberg built a house in Erckartswiller in 1973. It houses a small permanent team that manages a reception center and spiritual retreat for visitors from not only Alsace, but Germany and Switzerland as well. A chapel was built on the same property in 1994.

Geography
Erckartswiller lies entirely within the Northern Vosges Regional Nature Park.

Demographics
The inhabitants of Erckartswiller are known as Erckartswillerois (males) and Erckartswilleroises (females). Its population was 299 in 2017.

See also
 Communes of the Bas-Rhin department

Notes

References

External links

Communes of Bas-Rhin